Robert Roy Evans (born March 19, 1874) was a pitcher in Major League Baseball. He pitched from 1897 to 1903 for six different franchises. He was a graduate of Emporia State University. He was best known for scamming teams out of their money.

He was thought to have died in the 1915 Galveston Hurricane in Texas, however five years later, he was sentenced to prison for bigamy and was apparently married to at least 4 different women all at once. His assumed death is long thought to have just been another ruse, although it has never been confirmed. He served about 19 months at Lavenworth before being released on June 22, 1922. It is unknown what happened to him after this.

References

External links

1874 births
Major League Baseball pitchers
Baseball players from Tennessee
St. Louis Browns (NL) players
Louisville Colonels players
Washington Senators (1891–1899) players
New York Giants (NL) players
Brooklyn Superbas players
St. Louis Browns players
19th-century baseball players
Oshkosh Indians players
Lynchburg Hill Climbers players
Portsmouth Browns players
Columbus Senators players
Providence Clamdiggers (baseball) players
Providence Grays (minor league) players
Columbus Buckeyes (minor league) players
Williamsport Millionaires players
St. Paul Saints (AA) players
Danville Red Sox players
Arkansas City Grays players
Emporia State Hornets baseball players
American people convicted of bigamy
Florence Fiddlers players
Year of death missing